A wanted poster (or wanted sign) is a poster distributed to let the public know of a person whom authorities wish to apprehend. They generally include a picture of the person, either a photograph when one is available or of a facial composite image produced by the police.

Description

The poster will usually include a description of the wanted person(s) and the crime(s) for which they are sought. There is typically a set monetary reward offered to whoever catches the wanted criminal that is advertised on the poster. Wanted posters are commonly produced by a police department or other public government bureaus intended for public display such as on a physical bulletin board or in the lobby of a post office. Today many wanted posters are displayed on the Internet. However, wanted posters have also been produced by vigilante groups, railway security, private agencies such as Pinkerton, or by express companies that have sustained a robbery. Wanted posters also might include rewards for providing aid in the capture of the wanted person, usually in the form of money. These types of posters were also referred to as reward posters.

Electronic billboards
In 2007, the FBI began posting wanted posters on electronic billboards starting with 23 cities, and have been working to expand this system in other states. This allows them to instantly post a wanted notice in public view across the US. In 2014, the FBI claimed that at least 53 cases had been solved as a direct result of digital billboard publicity, and many others had been solved through the Bureau's overall publicity efforts that included the billboards. The FBI now claims to have access to over 5,200 billboards nationwide.

Bounty
Wanted posters for particularly notorious fugitives frequently offer a bounty for the capture of the person, or for a person who can provide information leading to such capture. Bounties provided an incentive for citizens to aid law enforcement, either by providing information, or by catching the criminal themselves.  More modern wanted posters may also include images of the fugitive's fingerprints. People who, as a profession, chase wanted individuals with the intent to collect their bounties are referred to as bounty hunters.

Images
Composite images for use in wanted posters can be created with various methods, including:

 E-FIT: Electronic Facial Identification Technique via computer
 Identikit
 PhotoFIT: Photographic Facial Identification Technique

Dead or alive

Historically, some wanted posters offering a reward contained the phrase "dead or alive". Thus one would get a reward for either bringing the person or his body to the authorities. This could indicate that the person was an outlaw, and that it was permissible to kill him. Alternatively, it might mean that it was permissible to kill him if he resisted arrest. While most issuers of wanted posters instead preferred the target to be taken alive in order to stand trial, some private organizations were willing to go to these extreme measures to protect their interests.

Wanted posters in the media
Wanted posters have been used by media sources to cast prominent figures as wild west criminals. Popular examples of this include the September 4, 1939 Edition of the British newspaper the Daily Mirror, which cast Adolf Hitler as a "reckless criminal" "wanted dead or alive". This idea was also used by The New York Post in their global search for Osama Bin Laden in 2001, shortly after President George W. Bush made the reference, "And there's an old poster out West, that I recall, that said, 'Wanted: Dead or Alive'."

Famous wanted posters 

 John Dillinger
 Billy the Kid
 Bonnie and Clyde
 Baby Face Nelson
 Jack the Ripper
 James Earl Ray 
 John Wilkes Booth
 D. B. Cooper
 Dan Breen
 Pablo Escobar
 Jesse James
 Zodiac Killer
 Osama bin Laden
 Pretty Boy Floyd
 Apollo Quiboloy

See also
 All-points bulletin
 America's Most Wanted
 Clarendon (typeface)
 Most wanted list
 Mug shot publishing industry
 Pittura infamante
 Rewards for Justice Program

References

External links 

 Wanted Posters Collection. Yale Collection of Western Americana, Beinecke Rare Book and Manuscript Library.

Espionage techniques
FBI: Most Wanted
Fugitives
Law enforcement techniques
Posters